{{DISPLAYTITLE:G2-structure}}

In differential geometry, a -structure is an important type of G-structure that can be defined on a smooth manifold.  If M is a smooth manifold of dimension seven, then a G2-structure is a reduction of structure group of the frame bundle of M to the compact, exceptional Lie group G2.

Equivalent conditions 
The condition of M  admitting a  structure is equivalent to any of the following conditions:
The first and second Stiefel–Whitney classes of M vanish.
M is orientable and admits a spin structure.
The last condition above correctly suggests that many manifolds admit -structures.

History 
A manifold with holonomy  was first introduced by Edmond Bonan in 1966, who constructed the parallel 3-form, the parallel 4-form and showed that this manifold was Ricci-flat. The first complete, but noncompact 7-manifolds with holonomy  were constructed by Robert Bryant and Salamon in 1989. The first compact 7-manifolds with holonomy  were constructed by Dominic Joyce in 1994, and compact  manifolds are sometimes known as "Joyce manifolds", especially in the physics literature. In 2013, it was shown by M. Firat Arikan, Hyunjoo Cho, and Sema Salur that any manifold with a spin structure, and, hence, a -structure, admits a compatible almost contact metric structure, and an explicit compatible almost contact structure was constructed for manifolds with -structure. In the same paper, it was shown that certain classes of -manifolds admit a contact structure.

Remarks 
The property of being a -manifold is much stronger than that of admitting a -structure.  Indeed, a -manifold is a manifold with a -structure which is torsion-free.

The letter "G" occurring in the phrases "G-structure" and "-structure" refers to different things.  In the first case, G-structures take their name from the fact that arbitrary Lie groups are typically denoted with the letter "G".  On the other hand, the letter "G" in "" comes from the fact that its Lie algebra is the seventh type ("G" being the seventh letter of the alphabet) in the classification of complex simple Lie algebras by Élie Cartan.

See also 
G2, G2-manifold, Spin(7) manifold

Notes

References 
.

Differential geometry
Riemannian geometry
Structures on manifolds